Yulia Tsibulskaya (Moldovan Cyrillic: Юлия Цибулски; born June 15, 1933, Leova) is a Moldovan-Russian composer. She is known in Russian as Юлия Георгиевна Цибульская and in Polish as Julia Cybulska.

Biography 
Yulia Tsibulskaya was born in Leova, Bessarabia.  She graduated from the Chișinău musical school (1954), the faculty of the theory and composition of the N. A. Rimsky-Korsakov Leningrad Conservatory (1960). She studied folklore themes in the works of Karol Szymanowski and Frédéric Chopin.

The teachers of the conservatory who determined Yulia Tsibulskaya’s further creative way were V. N. Salmanov (orchestration, composition), Alla Petrovna Maslakovets (Maria Yudina’s disciple, piano), Theodosius Antonovich Rubtsov (folklore), Alexander Naumovich Dolzhanskiy (polyphony).

From 1960 till 1974, Yulia Tsibulskaya was a teacher at the Chișinău  conservatory (the G. Musicescu College of Arts), from 1974 till 1977 — a scientific collaborator at the department of ethnography and art studies, attached to the Academy of Sciences of the Moldavian SSR. From 1977 till 1988, she was a musical editor in the “Literatura artistică” publishing house.

At present she resides in Nuremberg, Germany.

Decorations and  titles 
 A member of the USSR Union of Composers (1977).
 The N. K. Krupskaya prize from the Ministry of Education of the Moldavian SSR — for an important contribution in the musical education of the young people.
 Honored artist of Moldavia (1992).
 A prize from UNESCO for the best chorus composition for a mixed chorus (“Lullaby”) (1995).

References 

 Soare, soare, frăţioare!: Cântece pentru cei mici / Grigore Vieru; Alcăt. E. Macaleţ; Muz.: Iu. Ţibulschi. — Chişinău: Cartea moldovenească, 1973. — 115 p.: n.
 La poiană: «Zvon de frunză verde...»: Cântec pentru copii: [Pentru două voci şi pian] / Muz.: Iu. Ţibulschi; Author versuri: A. Blanovschi. — Chişinău: Timpul, 1973. — 4 p.
 Greeraşul-lăutar: «Greeraşul a cântat...»: Cântec pentru copii: [Pentru voce şi pian] / Muz.: Iu. Ţibulschi; Author versuri: Grigore Vieru. — Chişinău: Timpul, 1973. — 4 p.
 Cîntece din bătrîni / Alcăt. Iu. Ţibulschi; Il. de I. Cîrmu. — Chişinău: Literatura artistică, 1983. — 99 p., il.
 Cine crede: [Сuleg. de interviuri, publicistică, poezii, melodii pe versurile aut.] / Grigore Vieru; Alcăt. Iu. Ţibulschi; Prez. graf. de A. Macovei. — Chişinău: Literatura artistică, 1989. — 396 p.: n.
 Albinuţa: [Сartea preşcolarului] / Grigore Vieru; Des. de L. Sainciuc; Selecţ. şi îngrij. text. muz. Iu. Ţibulschi. — Chişinău: Hyperion, 1991. — 176 p.: il. color., n.
 Cîntînd cu iubire: [Culeg. de cîntece] / Iulia Ţibulschi, Grigore Vieru;  Prez. graf. Iaroslav Iliinîc. — Chişinău: Hyperion, 1996. — 86, [1] p. 
 Dragă mi-i şi mult mi-i drag: [Cântece populare] / Alcăt. Iu. Ţibulschi; Il. de I. Cîrmu. — Chişinău: Litera, 1998. — 88 p.: n.
 Цибульская Ю. Кароль Шимановский и музыкальный фольклор Подгалья // Кароль Шимановский: воспоминания, статьи, публикации: [Сборник] / Ред., сост. И. И. Никольской, Ю. В. Крейниной. — М.: Советский композитор, 1984. — С. 188–203.

Music 

  Songs by Iulia Tibulschi, performed by the author.

Moldovan composers
Russian composers
Women classical composers
20th-century classical composers
Composers for piano
1933 births
Living people
People from Leova District
Saint Petersburg Conservatory alumni
20th-century women composers